Dammeier is a surname. Notable people with the surname include:

 Bruce Dammeier (born 1961), American politician
 Detlev Dammeier (born 1968), German footballer and manager